This is a list of player transfers involving RFU Championship teams before or during the 2016–17 season. The list is of deals that are confirmed and are either from or to a rugby union team in the Championship during the 2015–16 season. It is not unknown for confirmed deals to be cancelled at a later date.

Bedford Blues

Players In
 Will Carrick-Smith from  London Scottish
 Jacob Fields from  Loughborough Students RUFC
 Tom James from  Loughborough Students RUFC
 Ben Adams from  Cambridge RUFC
 Ed Taylor from  Loughborough Students RUFC
 Christian Judge from  Plymouth Albion
 Tom Farrell from  Leinster
 Jason Hill from  Glasgow Warriors
 Elliot Clements-Hill from  Ampthill
 David Spelman from  Cambridge University RUFC

Players Out
 Charlie Clare to  Northampton Saints
 James Pritchard to  Coventry
 Phil Boulton to  Coventry
 Nick Fenton-Wells to  Bristol Rugby
 Mark Flanagan to  Saracens
 Tom Williams to  Rotherham Titans
 Peter White to  Coventry
 Steffan Jones to  Ampthill

Cornish Pirates

Players In
 Bar Bartlett from  Loughborough Students RUFC
 Nicolas de Battista from  Jockey Club de Rosario
 Edd Pascoe from  Redruth
 Timoci Kava from  Royal Navy

Players Out
 Laurie McGlone retired
 Craig Holland to  London Scottish
 Joe Atkinson to  London Scottish
 Aaron Carpenter to  London Welsh
 Adam Jamieson retired
 Marcus Garratt to  Wasps
 Kieran Hallett to  Plymouth Albion
 Tom Riley to  Newport RFC
 Kieran Goss to  Chinnor
 Rheon James to  Aberavon RFC
 Will Graulich released

Doncaster Knights

Players In
 Lloyd Hayes from  Rotherham Titans
 Jarad Williams from  Yorkshire Carnegie
 David Nolan from  Bourgoin
 Seán Scanlon from  Rotherham Titans
 Harry Allen from  London Welsh
 Ed Falkingham from  Hull Ionians
 Robin Hislop from  Rotherham Titans
 Beau Robinson from  Harlequins

Players Out
 Ollie Stedman to  Yorkshire Carnegie
 Jake Armstrong to  Jersey Reds
 Bevon Armitage to  Chinnor
 Will Hurrell to  Bristol Rugby
 Tyler Hotson to  Richmond
 Brad Field retired
 Jon Phelan released
 Viliame Veikoso released
 Jack Bergmanas released
 Ted Stagg released

Ealing Trailfinders

Players In
 Mark Bright from  London Scottish
 Harry Casson from  Moseley
 Luke Carter from  Rotherham Titans
 Curtis Wilson from  Rotherham Titans
 William Ryan from  Rotherham Titans
 Lewis Thiede from  Rotherham Titans
 Mike McFarlane from  Rosslyn Park
 James Cordy-Redden from  England Sevens
 James Gibbons from  Gloucester Rugby
 Ignacio Saenz Lancuba from  Jersey Reds
 Alex Davies from  London Welsh
 Lewis Jones from  Leeds Met RFC
 Liam Edwards from  Leeds Met RFC
 Luke Peters from  Leeds Met RFC

Players Out
 Harrison Orr to  Newcastle Falcons
 James Stephenson to  Nottingham
 Alex Davies to  Yorkshire Carnegie
 Eoghan Grace to  Coventry
 Tom Wheatcroft to  Coventry
 George Porter to  Cinderford
 Danny Kenny to  London Scottish
 Paul Spivey to  Rosslyn Park
 Toby Howley-Berridge to  Rosslyn Park
 Nathan Buck to  Ebbw Vale
 Nathan Hannay to  Chinnor
 Danny Barnes to  Oxford Harlequins
 Tristan Roberts to  US Cognac
 Michael Holford released
 Jamie Kilbane released
 Chris Kinloch released
 James Love released
 Sam Stanley released

Jersey Reds

Players In
 Mark Tampin from  Rotherham Titans
 Max Argyle from  Rotherham Titans
 Jordan Davies from  Rotherham Titans
 George Eastwell from  Loughborough Students RUFC
 Jake Armstrong from  Doncaster Knights
 James Voss from  Hartpury College R.F.C.
 Jack Cuthbert from  Edinburgh Rugby
 James Doyle from  North Harbour
 Sam Katz from  CR El Salvador
 Marc Thomas from  Ospreys
 Regan King from  Scarlets
 Kieran Hardy from  Scarlets
 George Watkins from  Bristol Rugby
 Jack Macfarlane from  Glasgow Hawks

Players Out
 Sam Lockwood to  Newcastle Falcons
 Alex Rae retired
 Ollie Evans to  Nottingham
 Danny Herriott to  Rotherham Titans
 Dave Markham to  Stade Rouennais
 Ignacio Saenz Lancuba to  Ealing Trailfinders
 Oliver Tomaszczyk to  USA Perpignan
 Martin Garcia-Veiga to  RC Vannes
 Aaron Penberthy to  CR El Salvador
 Tommy Spinks to  Glasgow Hawks
 Mark McCrea to  Malone
 Mark Cooke to  Blackheath
 Russell Anderson released
 Jack Burroughs released
 Ed Dawson released
 Ben Featherstone released
 Jack Moates released
 Rhys Owen released

London Irish

Players In
 Josh McNally from  London Welsh
 James Marshall from  Hurricanes
 Mike Coman from  Edinburgh Rugby
 Tommy Bell from  Leicester Tigers
 Greig Tonks from  Edinburgh Rugby
 Sebastian de Chaves from  Leicester Tigers
 Dave Porecki from  Saracens
 Danny Hobbs-Awoyemi from  Northampton Saints
 Max Northcote-Green from  Bath Rugby
 Ollie Hoskins from  Western Force
 Theo Brophy-Clews promoted from Academy
 Johnny Williams promoted from Academy
 Jerry Sexton from  Exeter Chiefs
 Ben Ransom from  Saracens
 Jason Harris-Wright from  Connacht
 Todd Gleave from  Rosslyn Park

Players Out
 Eoin Griffin to  Connacht
 Ian Nagle to  Leinster
 Tom Cruse to  Wasps
 Dominic Waldouck to  Ohio Aviators
 Jimmy Stevens to  Nottingham
 Nic Rouse retired
 Eoin Sheriff to  London Scottish
 Ollie Curry to  Rotherham Titans
 Halani Aulika to  Sale Sharks
 Andy Fenby retired
 Tom Guest retired
 Geoff Cross retired
 Sean Maitland to  Saracens
 Jonny Harris to  London Scottish
 George Skivington retired
 Matt Symons to  Wasps
 Leo Halavatau to  Soyaux Angoulême
 Rob McCusker to  Carmarthen Quins
 Shane Geraghty to  Bristol Rugby
 Chris Noakes released

London Scottish

Players In
 Robbie Fergusson from  Glasgow Warriors
 Jamie Stevenson from  Wasps
 Phil Cringle from  US Carcassonne
 Craig Holland from  Cornish Pirates
 George Cullen from  Oxford Harlequins
 Ed Hoadley from  Southend Saxons
 Joe Atkinson from  Cornish Pirates
 Eoin Sheriff from  London Irish
 Dom McGeekie from  Cardiff Metropolitan RFC
 Ifereimi Boladau from  Ospreys
 Grant Shiells from  Edinburgh Rugby
 Devlin Hope from  Coventry
 Jonny Harris from  London Irish
 Danny Kenny from  Ealing Trailfinders
 Jack Cullen from  Munster
 Dan Koroi from  Mogliano
 Ewan McQuillin from  Edinburgh Rugby
 Matt Marley from  Cardiff Blues
 Ben Rath from  Rotherham Titans

Players Out
 Chevvy Pennycook retired
 Mark Bright to  Ealing Trailfinders
 Will Carrick-Smith to  Bedford Blues
 Max Maidment to  Yorkshire Carnegie
 Evan Olmstead to  Newcastle Falcons
 Adam Kwasnicki to  London Welsh
 James Hallam to  London Welsh
 Josh Thomas-Brown to  London Welsh
 Oli Grove retired
 Ben Calder to  Ampthill
 Jimmy Litchfield to  Coventry

London Welsh

Players In
 Kristian Phillips from  Ospreys
 Heath Stevens from  Worcester Warriors
 Glyn Hughes from  Birmingham Moseley
 Adam Kwasnicki from  London Scottish
 James Hallam from  London Scottish
 Lovejoy Chawatama from  Rosslyn Park
 Josh Thomas-Brown from  London Scottish
 Aaron Carpenter from  Cornish Pirates
 Barney Maddison from  Rotherham Titans
 Josh Hodson from  Llandovery

Players Out
 Guy Armitage to  Wasps
 Brendon Snyman to  Coventry
 Richard Thorpe to  Chinnor
 Josh Davies to  Ealing Trailfinders
 Harry Allen to  Doncaster Knights
 Eddie Aholelei to  Timișoara Saracens
 Olly Barkley to  Kowloon RFC
 Matt Corker to  Richmond
 Josh McNally to  London Irish

Nottingham

Players In
 Jimmy Stevens from  London Irish
 Ben Hooper from  Yorkshire Carnegie
 Ollie Evans from  Jersey Reds
 Jordan Coghlan from  Munster
 James Stephenson from  Ealing Trailfinders
 Gearold Lyons from  Munster
 Shane Buckley from  Munster
 Tom Holmes from  Rotherham Titans
 Jacob Nash from  South Leicester

Players Out
 Conor Carey to  Connacht
 Dan Mugford to  Sale Sharks
 Viliame Iongi to  San Francisco Rush
 Rupert Cooper to  Plymouth Albion
 Ben Woods to  Old Belvedere
 Sam Coghlan Murray to  Terenure College
 Ricky Andrew to  Bangor
 Oris Nawaqaliva to  Ampthill
 Paul Grant to  Bath Rugby
 Jon Vickers released

Richmond

Players In
 Rupert Harden from  Benetton Treviso
 Matt Corker from  London Welsh
 Tyler Hotson from  Doncaster Knights
 Freddie Gabbitass from  Blackheath
 Daniel Carpo from  Timișoara Saracens

Players Out

Rotherham Titans

Players In
 Danny Herriott from  Jersey Reds
 Miles Normandale from  Cardiff Blues
 Joe Rees from  Worcester Warriors
 Tom Williams from  Bedford Blues
 Joe Graham from  Yorkshire Carnegie
 Chad Thorne from  Coventry
 Ian Williams from  Oxford Harlequins
 Joe Hutchinson from  CR La Vila
 Buster Lawrence from  Birmingham Moseley
 James Tyas from  Chinnor
 Tom MacDonald from  Hartpury College R.F.C.
 George Oliver from  Coventry
 Ollie Curry from  London Irish
 Luke Cole from  Gloucester Rugby
 Tom Hicks from  Gloucester Rugby
 Jack Ramshaw from  Yorkshire Carnegie
 George Tresidder from  Leicester Tigers
 Matt Dudman from  Yorkshire Carnegie
 Charlie Foley from  Birmingham Moseley
 Jake Henry from  Darlington Mowden Park
 Dan Tai from  Yorkshire Carnegie
 Cameron Hudson from  Wharfedale
 Will Thomas from  Llandovery RFC
 Ben Foley from  England Sevens
 Matt Walsh from  Darlington Mowden Park

Players Out
 Lloyd Hayes to  Doncaster Knights
 Mark Tampin to  Jersey Reds
 Max Argyle to  Jersey Reds
 Jordan Davies to  Jersey Reds
 Sean Scanlon to  Doncaster Knights
 Luke Carter to  Ealing Trailfinders
 Curtis Wilson to  Ealing Trailfinders
 William Ryan to  Ealing Trailfinders
 Lewis Thiede to  Ealing Trailfinders
 Barney Maddison to  London Welsh
 Joel Gill to  Darlington Mowden Park
 Josh Redfern to  Macclesfield
 James Elliott to  Birmingham Moseley
 Jack Preece to  Birmingham Moseley
 Tom Holmes to  Nottingham
 Robin Hislop to  Doncaster Knights
 Darran Harris to  Newport Gwent Dragons
 George Oram to  Birmingham Moseley
 Michael Cromie to  Banbury RFC
 Ben Rath to  London Scottish

Yorkshire Carnegie

Players In
 Ollie Stedman from  Doncaster Knights
 Steve McColl from  Gloucester Rugby
 Richard Mayhew from  Newcastle Falcons
 Michael Mayhew from  Waikato
 Max Maidment from  London Scottish
 Ross Graham from  Hawick RFC
 Joe Ford from  Sale Sharks
 Alex Davies from  Ealing Trailfinders
 Alex Gray from  England Sevens
 Jack Whetton from  Nevers
 Michael Cusack from  Glasgow Warriors
 Warren Seals from  Darlington Mowden Park
 Dan Sanderson from  Worcester Warriors

Players Out
 Jarad Williams to  Doncaster Knights
 Ben Hooper to  Nottingham
 Joel Hodgson to  Newcastle Falcons
 Kevin Sinfield retired
 Tom Ryder retired 
 David Doherty retired
 Joe Graham to  Rotherham Titans
 Jack Ramshaw to  Rotherham Titans
 Matt Dudman to  Rotherham Titans
 Dan Tai to  Rotherham Titans
 Jack Walker to  Bath Rugby
 Chris Jones retired
 James Tideswell to  Cinderford
 Fred Burdon to  Newcastle Falcons
 Chris Pilgrim released
 Jack Barnard released

See also
List of 2016–17 Premiership Rugby transfers
List of 2016–17 Pro12 transfers
List of 2016–17 Super Rugby transfers
List of 2016–17 Top 14 transfers

References

2016-17
2016–17 RFU Championship